Ortodossia is an EP by the Italian punk rock band CCCP Fedeli alla linea released in 1984.

Track listing 
 "Live in Pankow"
 "Spara Jurij"
 "Punk Islam"

Personnel 
 Giovanni Lindo Ferretti - vocals
 Massimo Zamboni - guitar
 Umberto Negri - bass
 Danilo Fatur - Artista del popolo
 Annarella - Benemerita soubrette

See also
 CCCP discography
 Consorzio Suonatori Indipendenti (C.S.I.)
 Per Grazia Ricevuta (PGR)
 Punk rock

References and footnotes

CCCP Fedeli alla linea albums
1984 EPs